Albert Edward "Bert" "Slosher" Avery (first ¼ 1883 – 14 November 1914) was an English rugby union and professional rugby league footballer who played in the 1900s and 1910s.

Background
Albert Avery was born in Buckfastleigh, Devon, and his death aged 31 was registered in Oldham, Lancashire, England, he died one-year after his brother had died in similar circumstances.

Playing career

International honours
Avery played four trial matches for England (RU) while at Plymouth and Devonport Albion, and won caps for England (RL) while at Oldham in 1910 against Wales (2 matches), in 1911 against Wales, and Australia (2 matches).

While at Oldham he was selected to go on the 1910 Great Britain Lions tour of Australia and New Zealand, and won caps for Great Britain against Australia, Australasia, and New Zealand, and in 1911-12 against Australia (2 matches).

County honours
Avery won 23-caps for Devon (RU) while at Plymouth and Devonport Albion, and won cap(s) for Lancashire (RL) while at Oldham.

Championship final appearances
Bert Avery played as a forward, i.e. number 8, in Oldham's 3-7 defeat by Wigan in the Championship Final during the 1908–09 season at The Willows, Salford on Saturday 1 May 1909.

Challenge Cup Final appearances
Bert Avery played as a forward, i.e. number 12, in Oldham's 3-17 defeat by Warrington in the 1907 Challenge Cup Final during the 1906–07 season at Wheater's Field, Broughton, Salford on Saturday 27 April 1907, in front of a crowd of 18,500, and played as a forward, i.e. number 9, and was sent-off for "being impertinent to the referee" in the 5-8 defeat by Dewsbury in the 1912 Challenge Cup Final during the 1911–12 season at Headingley Rugby Stadium, Leeds on Saturday 27 April 1912, in front of a crowd of 15,271.

County Cup Final appearances
Avery played as a forward, i.e. number 8, in Oldham's 9-10 defeat by Wigan in the 1908 Lancashire Cup Final during the 1908–09 season at Wheater's Field, Broughton, Salford on Saturday 19 December 1908.

Illness and death
Avery was taken ill during the summer of 1914, and a Testimonial match (in which Avery did not participate due to illness) between players from the 1910 Great Britain Lions tour of Australia and New Zealand and Colonial players of the British Empire took place at Watersheddings, Oldham on 14 September 1914. On 14 November 1914, Avery died at his home in Oldham.

References

External links
Statistics at orl-heritagetrust.org.uk

1883 births
1914 deaths
England national rugby league team players
English rugby league players
English rugby union players
Great Britain national rugby league team players
Lancashire rugby league team players
Oldham R.L.F.C. players
People from Buckfastleigh
Place of death missing
Plymouth Albion R.F.C. players
Rugby league centres
Rugby league five-eighths
Rugby league forwards
Rugby league players from Devon
Rugby union players from Devon